Sir Edward Crofton, 3rd Baronet may refer to: 

Sir Edward Crofton, 3rd Baronet (1687–1739)
Sir Edward Crofton, 3rd Baronet (1778–1816)